Tuberopeplus is a genus of longhorn beetles of the subfamily Lamiinae, containing the following species:

 Tuberopeplus chilensis Breuning, 1947
 Tuberopeplus krahmeri Cerda, 1980

References

Phacellini